Michael Tramontino (born 4 January 1959) is a South African cricketer. He played in 31 first-class and three List A matches from 1977/78 to 1987/88.

References

External links
 

1959 births
Living people
South African cricketers
Border cricketers
Griqualand West cricketers
KwaZulu-Natal cricketers
Cricketers from Durban